Muhammad Nur Aiman Mohd Zariff (born 1 October 1997) is a Malaysian professional racing cyclist, who currently rides for UCI Continental team .

Major results

2013
 2nd Time trial, National Junior Road Championships
2017
 1st  Team pursuit, Southeast Asian Games
 5th Overall Tour de Selangor
2018 
 6th Overall Tour of Indonesia
2019
 6th Overall Tour of Peninsular
 6th Overall Tour de Selangor
1st  Young rider classification
2020
 1st  Mountains classification, Tour de Langkawi
 2nd Overall Cambodia Bay Cycling Tour
1st  Points classification
2021 
 2nd Time trial National Road Championships
2022
 1st  Mountains classification, Tour de Langkawi

References

External links

Living people
1997 births
Malaysian male cyclists
Southeast Asian Games medalists in cycling
Southeast Asian Games gold medalists for Malaysia
Competitors at the 2017 Southeast Asian Games
Cyclists at the 2018 Asian Games
Competitors at the 2021 Southeast Asian Games